Chris Ray Hetherington (born November 27, 1972) is a former American football fullback in the NFL who last played for the San Francisco 49ers. He went to Yale University. He was signed as an undrafted free agent by the Cincinnati Bengals in 1996. He then played for the Indianapolis Colts from 1996 to 1998. He was then signed by the Carolina Panthers from 1999 to 2002. He then played for the St. Louis Rams in 2002. He then played for the Oakland Raiders in 2003 and 2004. He was then signed by the 49ers in 2005. 

Hetherington is one of several professional sports alumni of both Avon Old Farms school in Avon, Connecticut and Yale. At Avon, he was coached by Kevin Driscoll and was a three-sport standout (in baseball, ice hockey, and football). After graduating in 1991, he moved to Yale, where starred in football as starting quarterback and holds numerous passing records. He also played baseball at Yale, before graduating in 1995.

References

External links

Profile at CBS Sports
Tokyo Apache Appoint Chris Hetherington as President

1972 births
American football fullbacks
Carolina Panthers players
Indianapolis Colts players
Living people
Oakland Raiders players
Sportspeople from New Haven County, Connecticut
Players of American football from Connecticut
San Francisco 49ers players
St. Louis Rams players
Yale Bulldogs football players
People from North Branford, Connecticut
Avon Old Farms alumni